Claire Barratt (born 1974) is an English industrial archaeologist, steam engineer and television presenter.

Career
Barratt studied civil engineering at the University of Portsmouth, and whilst doing so, became more interested in mechanical engineering.

On graduation she worked at the Chiltern Open Air Museum, the Royal Armouries and the British Engineerium, where she remains a consultant engineer. It was from here that her television career was launched when she appeared on Channel 4's Salvage Squad – a programme about restoring historical machinery – first as a participant, later as co-presenter. Whilst filming, she completed a master's degree in Conservation of Industrial Heritage and won the Association for Industrial Archaeology Student Fieldwork Award.

Presently a freelance consultant industrial archaeologist, Barratt has restored and run many different vehicles, and is currently restoring a watermill in Cornwall. She is a member of Subterranea Britannica, a society which studies and records man-made underground sites.

Personal life
Barratt is married to fellow car-enthusiast Ben and has two daughters.

Filmography
 Salvage Squad, Channel 4, 2002–2004
 The History Detectives, BBC, 2007
 Rory McGrath's Best of British Engineering, Series Engineer, Discovery, 2006
 The Biggest Little Railway in the World, Channel 4, 2018
 Abandoned Places''

References

External links
 

1974 births
Living people
British mechanical engineers
English civil engineers
English archaeologists
English television presenters
Alumni of the University of Portsmouth
Place of birth missing (living people)
British women archaeologists